The 2009–10 St. Francis Terriers men's basketball team represented St. Francis College during the 2009–10 NCAA Division I men's basketball season. The team was coached by Brian Nash, who was in his fifth year at the helm of the St. Francis Terriers. The Terriers' home games were played at the Generoso Pope Athletic Complex. The team has been a member of the Northeast Conference since 1981.

Nash's team finished at 11–18 overall and 8–10 in conference play for an 8th-place finish. After the season Nash resigned, he produced a 47–99 record through five seasons as the Terriers' head coach.

Roster

Schedule and results

|-
!colspan=12 style="background:#0038A8; border: 2px solid #CE1126;;color:#FFFFFF;"| Regular Season

References

St. Francis Brooklyn Terriers men's basketball seasons
St. Francis
2009 in sports in New York City
2010 in sports in New York City